Therese Schlesinger, née Eckstein (6 June 1863 – 5 June 1940), was an Austrian feminist and politician.

Life
Therese Schlesinger was born in Vienna, capital of the Austrian Empire, on 6 June 1863 to an upper middle-class Jewish family. Among her siblings were the early psychologist Emma Eckstein, the writer Gustav Eckstein and the polymath Frederick Eckstein. She married Viktor Schlesinger on 24 June 1888 and her daughter, Anna, was born a year later. The birth was very hard on Schlesinger with her right leg being partially disabled enough to force her into a wheelchair for several years. Her husband died on 23 January 1891. From 1905 she lived with her mother, daughter, sister Emma and brother Gustav until their deaths during the 1920s. Her daughter's suicide in 1920 profoundly effected Schlesinger. After the Anschluss with Nazi Germany in 1938, she fled to France.  She spent the rest of her life in a sanatorium in Blois, where she died on 5 June 1940.

Activities
Beginning in 1894, Schlesinger became involved in the Austrian feminist movement, joining the General Austrian Women's Association ( (AÖFV) and participated in the 1894 Enquéte on the Condition of Female Viennese Wage-Workers. At the end of 1897, she left the AÖFV and joined the Social Democratic Workers' Party of Austria (. "In the years to follow, Schlesinger appeared at the center of debates over the best way to win women to the cause of Social Democracy. Her position was clear: the demands of trade union organizations did not extend to securing the political education of women and women’s voting rights, equally important demands as far as Schlesinger was concerned. Furthermore, if a new kind of solidarity were to be developed between people within the framework of a socialist project, it was first of all necessary to treat cultural questions pertaining to ‘everyday’ life and consciousness as political concerns." From 1919 to 1923, she served as a member of the National Council. Later, she joined the Federal Council, resigning on 5 December 1930.

Notes

References

1863 births
1940 deaths
Politicians from Vienna
Austro-Hungarian Jews
Jewish Austrian politicians
Social Democratic Party of Austria politicians
Members of the Constituent National Assembly (Austria)
Members of the National Council (Austria)
Members of the Federal Council (Austria)
Austrian feminists
Austrian women's rights activists
Austrian socialist feminists
Jewish feminists
20th-century Austrian women politicians